John Frederick Steele (born 23 July 1946 in Brown Edge, Staffordshire) is a former English first-class cricketer for Leicestershire and Glamorgan. An allrounder who bowled left-arm spin, he made 15,054 runs and took 584 wickets in his career which started in 1970 and ended in 1986.

His elder brother David played Test cricket for England.

Steele was one of ten members of Leicestershire's first County Championship winning team in 1975 to have a road in Leicester named after him by the city council. Chris Balderstone, Peter Booth, Brian Davison, Barry Dudleston, Ken Higgs, David Humphries, Ray Illingworth,
Norman McVicker and Roger Tolchard were the others. Jack Birkenshaw, Graham McKenzie and Mick Norman missed out as there were already roads using their surnames.

References

External links
 John Steele at Cricinfo
 John Steele at Cricket Archive

1946 births
Living people
English cricketers
Glamorgan cricketers
Leicestershire cricketers
KwaZulu-Natal cricketers
English cricket umpires
Sportspeople from Staffordshire
Staffordshire cricketers
D. H. Robins' XI cricketers
T. N. Pearce's XI cricketers
Young England cricketers